Kazakhstan participated at the 2018 Summer Youth Olympics in Buenos Aires, Argentina from 6 October to 18 October 2018.

Competitors

Archery

Kazakhstan qualified one female archer based on its performance at the 2017 World Archery Youth Championships. Later, they qualified one male archer based on its performance at the Asian Continental Qualification Tournament.

Individual

Team

Athletics

Badminton

Kazakhstan qualified one player based on the Badminton Junior World Rankings.

Singles

Team

Basketball

Kazakhstan qualified a boys' team based on the U18 3x3 National Federation Ranking.

 Boys' tournament – 1 team of 4 athletes

Boxing

Boys

Girls

Canoeing

Kazakhstan qualified four boats based on its performance at the 2018 World Qualification Event.

 Boys' C1 – 1 boat
 Boys' K1 – 1 boat
 Girls' C1 – 1 boat
 Girls' K1 – 1 boat

Cycling

Kazakhstan qualified a boys' and girls' combined team based on its ranking in the Youth Olympic Games Junior Nation Rankings.

 Boys' combined team – 1 team of 2 athletes
 Girls' combined team – 1 team of 2 athletes

Diving

Fencing

Kazakhstan qualified one athlete based on its performance at the 2018 Cadet World Championship.

 Girls' Épée – Tamila Muridova

Girls

Gymnastics

Acrobatic
Kazakhstan qualified a mixed pair based on its performance at the 2018 Acrobatic Gymnastics World Championship.

 Mixed pair – 1 team of 2 athletes

Artistic
Kazakhstan qualified one gymnast based on its performance at the 2018 Asian Junior Championship.

 Boys' artistic individual all-around – 1 quota

Rhythmic
Kazakhstan qualified one gymnast based on its performance at the 2018 Asian Junior Championship.

 Girls' rhythmic individual all-around – 1 quota

Trampoline
Kazakhstan qualified one gymnast based on its performance at the 2018 Asian Junior Championship.

 Girls' trampoline – 1 quota

Judo

Individual

Team

Karate

Kazakhstan qualified one athlete based on the rankings in the Buenos Aires 2018 Olympic Standings.

 Boys' −68 kg – Abilmansur Batyrgali

Modern pentathlon

Rugby sevens

Group stage

Fifth place game

Shooting

Individual

Team

Swimming

Taekwondo

Tennis

Singles

Doubles

Triathlon

Individual

Relay

Weightlifting

Kazakhstan qualified four athletes based on its performance at the 2017 World Youth Championships.

 Boys' events – 2 quotas (not used)
 Girls' events – 2 quotas (not used)

Wrestling

Key:
  – Victory by Fall
  – Without any points scored by the opponent
  – With point(s) scored by the opponent
  – Without any points scored by the opponent
  – With point(s) scored by the opponent

References

2018 in Kazakhstani sport
Nations at the 2018 Summer Youth Olympics
Kazakhstan at the Youth Olympics